Jus post bellum (Latin for "Justice after war") is a concept that deals with the morality of the termination phase of war, including the responsibility to rebuild. The idea has some historical pedigree as a concept in just war theory.  In modern times, it has been developed by a number of just war theorists and international lawyers.  However, the concept means different things to the contributors in each field. For lawyers, the concept is much less clearly defined, and many have rejected the usefulness of the concept altogether. The concept continues to attract scholarly interest in the field of international humanitarian law.

Background
The Canadian philosopher Brian Orend is usually considered the initiator of the debate. He argued that just war theory was incomplete in dealing only with the morality of using force (jus ad bellum) and the morality of conduct during war (jus in bello). He cited Immanuel Kant as the first to consider a three-pronged approach to the morality of armed conflict and concluded that a third branch of just war theory, the morality of the termination phase of war, had been overlooked. A related concept to the jus post bellum is the lex pacificatoria, the law of peacemaking by treaty to introduce the jus post bellum phase.

Purpose
The purpose of the concept and its usefulness depends on whether it is considered as a moral or a legal concept.  Its usefulness as a matter of law is very unclear.  As a concept in just war theory, the jus post bellum debate considers a number of issues:

 Provide terms for the end of war; once the rights of a political community have been vindicated, further continuation of war becomes an act of aggression.
 Provide guidelines for the construction of peace treaties.
 Provide guidelines for the political reconstruction of defeated states.
 Prevent draconian and vengeful peace terms; the rights a just state fights for in a war provide the constraints on what can be demanded from the defeated belligerent.

Thus, the areas within which jus post bellum applies can include restraining conquest; political reconstruction, especially in the case of genocide and war crimes; and economic reconstruction, including restoration and reparations.

See also
 Jus ad bellum
 Jus in bello
 Just War Theory
 Lex pacificatoria

References
 Allman, Mark J. and Winright, Tobias L. "Jus Post Bellum: Extending the Just War Theory" in Faith in Public Life, College Theology Society Annual Volume 53, 2007 (Maryknoll, NY: Orbis Books, 2008), 241-264
 Allman, Mark J. and Winright, Tobias L. After the Smoke Clears: The Just War Tradition and Post War Justice (Maryknoll, NY: Orbis Books, 2010)
 DiMeglio, Richard P. "The Evolution of the Just War Tradition: Defining Jus Post Bellum"  Military Law Review (2006), Vol. 186, pp. 116–163.
 Orend, Brian. War in Stanford Encyclopedia of Philosophy, 2000/2005.

Specific

Just war theory
Aftermath of war